Adolf Wiklund (5 June 1879 in Långserud, Värmland – 2 April 1950 in Stockholm) was a Swedish composer and conductor. His father was an organist. After graduating from the Royal College of Music, Stockholm as an organist and music teacher, Wiklund was awarded scholarships to study piano in Sweden and then in Paris. His debut as a piano soloist came in 1902 playing his own Konsertstycke in C major, Op 1.

After 1911 he worked mainly as a conductor. He conducted the Swedish Royal Orchestra from 1911 to 1924, he was director of the Royal Swedish Opera in 1923, and he served as principal conductor of the Stockholm Concert Society until 1938.

Wiklund's compositions are Romantic and nationalistic in style. His later works show the influence of Impressionism. His compositions have had a great impact on Swedish music. His output includes two piano concertos, a symphonic poem Sommarnatt och soluppgång ("Summer night and sunrise"), a symphony, and a violin sonata.

References 

1879 births
1950 deaths
People from Säffle Municipality
People from Värmland
Romantic composers
Royal College of Music, Stockholm alumni
Swedish classical composers
Swedish male classical composers
Swedish conductors (music)
Male conductors (music)
20th-century conductors (music)
20th-century Swedish male musicians
20th-century Swedish musicians
19th-century male musicians
19th-century musicians